Connie Powell (born 13 July 2000) is an English rugby union player. She is a member of the England women's national rugby union team and plays for Gloucester-Hartpury in the Premier 15s.

International career

After progressing through the England U18 Talent Development Group, Powell was named in the U20 squads in 2017-18, 2018-19, and 2019-20. She made her full England debut off the bench against the USA in November 2021.

In September 2022 Powell was named in the England squad for the COVID-delayed 2021 Rugby World Cup.

Club career 

In 2016 Powell moved to Gloucestershire to study for a BTEC at Hartpury College and began playing for Gloucester-Hartpury.

Early life and education 
Powell grew up in Suffolk where she played for Sudbury RUFC and Eastern Counties.

References 

Living people
2000 births
England women's international rugby union players
English female rugby union players
21st-century English women